Gowy Daraq-e Sofla (also Romanized as Gowy Daraq-e Soflá; also known as Gowy Daraq-e Pā'īn) is a village in Sarajuy-ye Shomali Rural District, in the Central District of Maragheh County, East Azerbaijan Province, Iran. At the 2006 census, its population was 59, in 12 families.

References 

Towns and villages in Maragheh County